Chang Kai-chen and Zheng Saisai were the defending champions, but Zheng chose not to participate this year. Chang played alongside Duan Yingying, but lost in the first round to Nicha Lertpitaksinchai and Peangtarn Plipuech.

Liang Chen and Lu Jingjing won the title, defeating Japanese second seeds Shuko Aoyama and Makoto Ninomiya in the final 3–6, 7–6(7–2), [13–11].

Seeds

Draw

References 
 Main Draw

Jiangxi International Women's Tennis Open - Doubles
2016 Doubles